Salam Investment Ltd. (Arabic:السلام للاستثمار), was a brokerage and commodity trading company. It was founded in Munich, Germany and is a firm which operates in Europe as well as in Saudi Arabia, United Arab Emirates, Qatar, Bahrain, Kuwait and Oman. The company was headquartered in Mahé, the largest island of the Seychelles.

Operations

Overview 
The firm is part of a consortium of companies particularly strong in the Middle East, especially in Saudi Arabia, Qatar, Bahrain, Kuwait, and the UAE countries, in each of which Salam Investment consistently holds a table position. Salam Investment´s strength also extends to Eastern Europe and Asia.

Business sectors 
Salam Investment operates in four core sectors:

 Islamic banking
 Private banking and trust
 Commodity trading (metals, minerals, crude oil, oil products, coal, natural gas and agricultural products)
 Financial advisory

Next to these four main Sectors, Salam Investment is also active in auctioneering, specialty retail, venture capital, and asset management.

Islamic business model
Following the Islamic business model which adheres closely to the deeply rooted Islamic banking principles, the Sharia-compliant banking group is planning to be instrumental in bridging the gap between modern financial demands and intrinsic Islamic values, for the numerous industry standards and development in Europe.

References

Financial services companies of Germany